Laura Camila Lozano Ramírez (born 25 October 1986) is a Colombian professional racing cyclist, who currently rides for UCI Women's Team . She competed at the 2015 UCI Road World Championships.

See also
 List of 2015 UCI Women's Teams and riders

References

External links

1986 births
Living people
Colombian female cyclists
Place of birth missing (living people)
20th-century Colombian women
21st-century Colombian women
Competitors at the 2006 Central American and Caribbean Games